Glenn Gray Knoblauch (June 7, 1900 – August 23, 1963), known professionally as Glen Gray, was an American jazz saxophonist and leader of the Casa Loma Orchestra.

Early years
Gray was born to Lurdie P. and Agnes (Gray) Knoblauch in Roanoke, Illinois, United States. His father was a saloon keeper and railroad worker who died when Glen was two years of age. He had an older sister. His widowed mother married George H. DeWilde, a coal miner, and moved her family to Roanoke. Gray graduated from Roanoke High School, in 1917 where he played basketball and acquired his nickname, "Spike".

Career
Gray attended the American Conservatory of Music in 1921 but left during his first year to go to Peoria, Illinois, to play with George Haschert's orchestra. From 1924 to 1929, he played with several orchestras in Detroit, Michigan.

Gray served as leader of the Casa Loma Orchestra although the orchestra itself had been formed as a collective group, with no designated leader. Their mid-1930s appearances on the long-run radio comedy-variety program, the Camel Caravan, (introduced with their theme, "Smoke Rings") increased their popularity. Gray chose not to conduct the band in the early years, playing in the saxophone section while violinist Mel Jenssen acted as conductor. In 1937, the band overwhelmingly voted in favor of Glen leading the orchestra, and Gray finally accepted the job. By the mid-1940s, Gray would come to own the band and the Casa Loma name. For a time, during this period, the band featured guitarist Herb Ellis, trumpeter Bobby Hackett, pianist Nick Denucci and cornetist Red Nichols.

By 1950, the Casa Loma band had ceased touring, and Gray retired to Massachusetts. The later recordings on Capitol Records (beginning with Casa Loma in Hi-Fi in 1956 and continuing through the Sounds of the Great Bands series) were done with Gray leading a group of studio musicians in Hollywood (although several of Gray's "alumni" occasionally featured). In all, some 14 high-fidelity and stereo recordings were made for Capitol under the name of Glen Gray and the Casa Loma Orchestra before Gray's death in 1963.

Major recordings
He recorded and released the original version of the jazz and big band standard "Sunrise Serenade" featuring Frankie Carle on piano in 1938. His other recordings consisted of "Blue Moon", "Blue Champagne", "True", "The Old Spinning Wheel", and "Learning".

Personal life
Gray and his wife had one son.

In 1963, Gray died in Plymouth, Massachusetts of lymphoma, aged 63.

References

External links
 
 Glen Gray biography at Swingmusic.net
 The Glen Gray and the Casa Loma Orchestra records, 1915-1979 are located in the Northeastern University Libraries, Archives and Special Collections Department, Boston, MA.
 Glen Gray recordings at the Discography of American Historical Recordings

1900 births
1963 deaths
American jazz saxophonists
American male saxophonists
Big band bandleaders
People from Woodford County, Illinois
Deaths from lymphoma
Deaths from cancer in Massachusetts
People from Plymouth, Massachusetts
Illinois Wesleyan University alumni
American bandleaders
Swing bandleaders
20th-century American saxophonists
Jazz musicians from Massachusetts
Jazz musicians from Illinois
20th-century American male musicians
American male jazz musicians
Casa Loma Orchestra members